Dance on the Volcano (German: Tanz auf dem Vulkan) is a 1938 German historical musical comedy film directed by Hans Steinhoff and starring Gustaf Gründgens, Sybille Schmitz and Ralph Arthur Roberts.  It was shot at the Johannisthal Studios in Berlin. The film's sets were designed by the art director Rochus Gliese. A light-hearted costume film the production was a significant departure for both its director, best known for his Nazi-supporting propaganda films, and its star Gründgens, celebrated as a classical actor.

It made significant changes to the historical story, including turning Jean-Gaspard Deburau from a mime into a singer. Gründgens was unhappy with his performance, while both Adolf Hitler and the Minister of Propaganda Joseph Goebbels were critical of the production. This had led to some sources mistakenly suggesting it was either banned or had its release delayed for several years. In fact, the film was given an immediatate release and appears to have been popular with contemporary audiences.

Synopsis
In Paris in 1830, the popular singer Jean-Gaspard Deburau performs in front of large crowds Théâtre des Funambules every evening. In the day he secretly write satirical ballads against the reactionary reign of Charles X. When both men compete for the romantic affections of Countess Cambouilly, Debureau begins to openly sing his attacks on the monarch. He is sentenced to death, but is rescued on the steps of the guillotine when the people of Paris rise up and overthrow the King, driving him from the country and placing his cousin Louis Phillipe on the throne.

Cast
 Gustaf Gründgens as 	Komödiant Debureau
 Sybille Schmitz as 	Gräfin Heloise Cambouilly
 Ralph Arthur Roberts as 	König Karl X. 
 Theo Lingen as 	Graf Cambouilly
 Gisela Uhlen as 	Schauspielerin Angèle Destouches
 Hilde Hildebrand as	Gräfin X
 Hans Leibelt as Prinz Louis Philippe
 Will Dohm as 	Theaterdirektor Pomponille
 Gretl Theimer as 	Schirmverkäuferin
 Paul Bildt as 	Mönch
 Walter Werner as 	Debureaus Freund Maurac
 Daisy Spies as Bühnentänzerin
 Franz Nicklisch as 	Debureaus Freund Larbaud
 Erich Ziegel as 	Fürst Sulluc
 Elsa Wagner as 	Pauline Pomponille
 Wolf Trutz as 	Schauspieler Renard
 Franz Weber as 	Gardobier Gaston
 Fred Becker as 	Solotänzer 
 Eduard Bornträger as 	Königsfreundlicher Pariser Bürger
 Egon Brosig as 	Flugblattlesender Pariser Bürger 
 Curt Cappi as 	Theaterportier 
 Ernst Dernburg as Baron am Königshof 
 Jac Diehl as Soldat 
 Robert Dorsay as 	Theaterintendant 
 Erich Dunskus as 	Gefängniswärter 
 Max Ernst as 	Theaterarbeiter / Pariser Bürger 
 Doris Krüger as 	Tochter des Gastwirts 
 Fred Köster as 	Lakai bei Graf Cambouilly 
 Ernst Legal as 	Dr. Thibaud 
 Karl Meixner as 	Aufwiegler 
 Luise Morland as 	Theaterbesucherin 
 Hadrian Maria Netto as 	Polizeipräfekt Gravon
 Karl Platen as Prinz Louis Philippes Diener Theodor 
 Ernst Albert Schaach as 	Lakai beim Ball 
 Hans Schneeberger as 	Adjutant des Königs 
 S.O. Schoening as 	Theaterbesucher 
 Werner Schott as 	Soldat 
 Heinrich Schroth as Prinz Louis Philippes Vertrauter 
 Willi Schur as Plakatkleber 
 Werner Segtrop as 	Hausmeister Georgieff 
 Werner Stock as 	Theaterangestellter 
 Heinz Wemper as 	Henkersknecht 
 Max Wilmsen as Theaterbesucher 
 Bruno Ziener as Logenschließer

References

Bibliography 
 Klaus, Ulrich J. Deutsche Tonfilme: Jahrgang 1938. Klaus-Archiv, 1988.
 Niven, Bill, Hitler and Film: The Führer's Hidden Passion. Yale University Press, 2018.
 O'Brien, Mary-Elizabeth. Nazi Cinema as Enchantment: The Politics of Entertainment in the Third Reich. Camden House, 2006.
 Rentschler, Eric. The Ministry of Illusion: Nazi Cinema and Its Afterlife. Harvard University Press, 1996.

External links 
 

1938 films
Films of Nazi Germany
1938 musical comedy films
1938 comedy films
German musical comedy films
1938 musical films
1930s German-language films
Films directed by Hans Steinhoff
Tobis Film films
Films shot at Johannisthal Studios
1930s German films
Films set in 1830
Films set in Paris
German historical films
1930s historical films